Four referendums were held in Switzerland in 1991. The first two were held on 3 March on lowering the voting age to 18, which was approved, and on a popular initiative on promoting public transport, which was rejected. The third and fourth were held on 2 June on reorganising the federal finances, which was rejected, and amending the military penal code, which was approved.

Results

March: Lowering the voting age to 18

March: Promotion of public transport

June: Federal finances

June: Amendment to the military penal code

References

1991 referendums
1991 elections in Switzerland
Referendums in Switzerland